More Tales from the Orbservatory is the twelfth studio album from ambient house duo The Orb, released on 3 June 2013.

Background
Like The Orbserver in the Star House, the album features reggae producer Lee 'Scratch' Perry on vocals. It was also recorded at the same sessions of The Orbserver in the Star House.

Critical reception

Initial critical response to More Tales from the Orbservatory was mixed to positive. At Metacritic, which assigns a normalized rating out of 100 to reviews from mainstream critics, the album has received an average score of 61, based on 4 reviews.

Track listing

Personnel
The Orb
Alex Paterson – production
Thomas Fehlmann – production

Other personnel
Lee 'Scratch' Perry – vocals, production

References

2013 albums
The Orb albums
Lee "Scratch" Perry albums
Cooking Vinyl albums
The End Records albums